Reece Bellotti is an English professional boxer. He held the Commonwealth featherweight title from 2017 to 2018, and challenged once for the British featherweight title in 2018. As an amateur, he won two ABA national championships, one at bantamweight in 2012 and the 2013 featherweight title.

Early life 
Reece Bellotti was born on 7 December 1990 in Watford, Hertfordshire. His father, like himself, is an electrician working in lighting in the film-industry, while his mother is a manager at a pre-school. Bellotti started boxing at age 15 as a means to keep fit at the South Oxhey Boxing Club in Watford. He had his first amateur fight at the age of 17, and under the tutelage of amateur trainer Mick Courtney, Bellotti went on to win the ABA bantamweight championships in 2012, and again at featherweight in 2013.

Professional career

Bellotti made his professional debut on 28 May 2015, at the York Hall in London, beating Joe Beeden by knockout (KO) in the first-round. After winning his first nine fights, eight by stoppage, Bellotti's first title shot came against Jamie Speight on 1 July 2017, at the O2 Arena, London, on the undercard of the Frank Buglioni vs. Ricky Summers British light-heavyweight title fight. Bellotti defeated Speight by technical knockout (TKO) in the eighth-round to capture the WBC International Silver featherweight title.

On 13 October 2017, he challenged Jason Cunningham for the Commonwealth featherweight title at the York Hall, London. The fight was the main event on a card televised on Sky Sports. In a back and forth contest, Bellotti dropped Cunningham in the fifth-round with a right hook to the head. Cunningham made it to his feet and saw out the remainder of the round, only to be stopped by a barrage of punches in the sixth, giving Bellotti the TKO win and Commonwealth featherweight title. He would defend his Commonwealth title against Ben Jones on 2 February 2018, at the O2 Arena, London, again winning by sixth-round TKO, only to lose the title in his second defence against Ryan Doyle on 6 June 2018, suffering his first professional defeat via TKO in the fifth-round.

On 22 December 2018, Bellotti challenged British featherweight champion Ryan Walsh at The O2 Arena. Bellotti went the distance for the third time in his career, losing by split decision (SD), with one judge scoring the bout 116–113 in Bellotti's favour, while the other two scored it 116–112 to Walsh.

Bellotti once again fought for the vacant WBC International Silver featherweight title on 11 October 2019, against Italian Francesco Grandelli at the PalaTrento in Trento, Italy. Bellotti lost the fight via SD over ten rounds. One judge had Bellotti winning with 96–95, while the other two scored the bout 96–95 and 96–94 for Grandelli.

Professional boxing record

References

England Boxing champions
Year of birth missing (living people)
Date of birth missing (living people)
Living people
English male boxers
Commonwealth Boxing Council champions
Sportspeople from Watford
Featherweight boxers
English people of Italian descent